Polonium tetrachloride (also known as polonium(IV) chloride) is a chemical compound with the formula PoCl4. The salt is a hygroscopic bright yellow crystalline solid at room temperature. Above 200 °C, it tends to decompose into polonium dichloride and excess chlorine, similar to selenium tetrachloride and tellurium tetrachloride.

Structure
Polonium tetrachloride is either monoclinic or triclinic.

Appearance
Polonium tetrachloride is bright yellow at room temperature. At its melting point (300 °C), it becomes straw yellow, and at its boiling point (390 °C), it becomes scarlet. Its vapours are purple-brown until 500 °C, when they turn blue-green.

Preparation
Polonium tetrachloride may be prepared by:
halogenation of polonium dioxide with dry hydrogen chloride, gaseous thionyl chloride, or phosphorus pentachloride;
dissolving of polonium metal in hydrochloric acid;
heating polonium dioxide to 200 °C in carbon tetrachloride vapour;
reaction of polonium metal with dry chlorine gas in 200 °C.

Chemistry
Polonium tetrachloride forms a complex with two moles of tributyl phosphate.

Like selenium tetrachloride and tellurium tetrachloride, polonium tetrachloride forms  and  halogen complexes.

References

Polonium compounds
Chlorides
Metal halides
Chalcohalides